In Greek mythology, Soter (Ancient Greek: Σωτήρ means 'saviour, deliverer') was the personification or daimon of safety, preservation and deliverance from harm.

Mythology

Suda 
Suidas makes him the brother and husband of Praxidike and by her the father of Ktesios, Arete and Homonoia. (Note that both Soter and Ktesios were also cult titles of Zeus).
Praxidike (Exacter of Justice): A deity whose head alone is venerated. Mnaseas in his treatise On Europe says that Soter (Saviour) and his sister Praxidike (Exacter of Justice) had a son Ctesius (Household) and daughters Homonoia (Concord) and Arete (Virtue), who were called Praxidikai (Exacters of Penalties) after their mother.

Orphic hymn 
In the Orphic Hymns, Praxidike was identified with Persephone, Soter with Zeus, and their daughters Praxidikai with the Erinyes.

Aeschylus' account 
According to Aeschylus, Soter as the husband of Peitharchia and father of Eupraxia.
When you invoke the gods, do not be ill-advised. For Peitharkhia (Obedience) is the mother of Eupraxia (Success), wife of Soter (Salvation)--as the saying goes. So she is, but the power of god Zeus is supreme, and often in bad times it raises the helpless man out of harsh misery even when stormclouds are lowering over his eyes.

Soteria 
Soteria (Σωτηρία), personification of the abstract concept of safety and salvation, was also worshipped by the Greeks. She had a sanctuary in Patrae, which was believed to have been founded by Eurypylos of Thessaly.

Notes

References 

 Aeschylus, translated in two volumes. 1. Seven Against Thebes by Herbert Weir Smyth, Ph.D. Cambridge, MA. Harvard University Press. 1926. Online version at the Perseus Digital Library. Greek text available from the same website.
 The Hymns of Orpheus. Translated by Taylor, Thomas (1792). University of Pennsylvania Press, 1999. Online version at the theoi.com
 Pausanias, Description of Greece with an English Translation by W.H.S. Jones, Litt.D., and H.A. Ormerod, M.A., in 4 Volumes. Cambridge, MA, Harvard University Press; London, William Heinemann Ltd. 1918. . Online version at the Perseus Digital Library
 Suida, Suda Encyclopedia translated by Ross Scaife, David Whitehead, William Hutton, Catharine Roth, Jennifer Benedict, Gregory Hays, Malcolm Heath Sean M. Redmond, Nicholas Fincher, Patrick Rourke, Elizabeth Vandiver, Raphael Finkel, Frederick Williams, Carl Widstrand, Robert Dyer, Joseph L. Rife, Oliver Phillips and many others. Online version at the Topos Text Project.

Greek gods
Personifications in Greek mythology
Daimons
Savior gods
Tutelary gods

lt:Soteras